Las Ratas may refer to:

 Las ratas (novel), a 1962 novel by Miguel Delibes, and a 1997 film
 Las ratas an Argentine film of 1963 by Luis Saslavsky
 "Las ratas", a story in the 2014 Spanish anthology film Wild Tales
 Las ratas, a small volcano in Santiago Tianguistenco municipality, Mexico

See also
The Rats (disambiguation)